The Vaught House (also known as the Nicholson House) is a historic residence in Huntsville, Alabama.  It was built in 1900 in what was then the East Huntsville Addition, a suburb made up primarily of company houses for nearby cotton mills.  Its Victorian architecture style set it apart from its more modest bungalow neighbors.  The house has an irregular plan, and its hipped roof features several dormers and gables.  Centered on the façade is a single-story pedimented portico leading to the main entrance, and above it is a small pedimented balcony accessed from the upstairs bedroom.  Both pediments are decorated with jigsawed designs.  Both doors on the front feature rectangular transoms.  A curved porch runs from the main portico around the southwest corner of the house; it originally featured Stick-Eastlake style frieze and balustrade, but was later replaced with a solid frieze and closely spaced rectangular balusters.  The house was listed on the National Register of Historic Places in 1981.  It is included in the Five Points Historic District, which was listed on the National Register in 2012.

References

National Register of Historic Places in Huntsville, Alabama
Houses on the National Register of Historic Places in Alabama
Victorian architecture in Alabama
Houses completed in 1900
Houses in Huntsville, Alabama
Historic district contributing properties in Alabama